This list of hospitals in Ukraine includes notable and noteworthy hospitals in Ukraine throughout its history. Despite the reduction of the number of hospitals in the late 1990s because of fiscal constraints, Ukraine still has an extensive health care infrastructure.   Ukraine went from 3,754 hospital beds in 1994 to 2,369 hospital beds in 2012. During this period, many of the rural hospitals were converted to primary care clinics.

Hospitals

See also
Healthcare in Ukraine
History of hospitals

References

 
 

List
Ukraine
Hospitalsi
Ukraine